Gore Bay is a coastal settlement about  from Cheviot, New Zealand. 

It has a surfing beach with summer beach houses and 14 permanent residents. There are two local camping grounds, each with beach access and business. It is a popular New Year's Eve venue. Of note is Cathedral Gully, a spectacular weathered clay canyon.

The cottage at 60 Moody Street that once belonged to Mrs. Eliza Robinson, wife of local runholder William 'Ready Money' Robinson, is registered by Heritage New Zealand as a Category II structure, with registration number 1769.

Toponymy
The Maori name for this place is Pāua pirau meaning decayed pāua.

The place name Gore Bay is not an official name but is a recorded name that is probably derived from Gore's Bay shown on Captain Cook's map of New Zealand as the bay between Banks Island and the southern island, T’avai Poenammoo.

Climate

References

Populated places in Canterbury, New Zealand
Hurunui District